Jaroslav Peregrin (born 1957) is a professor of logic at Charles University in Prague and also a faculty member at the Academy of Sciences of the Czech Republic. He has published almost a hundred books and articles in several languages. Peregrin writes in Czech, English, German and Portuguese.

English language publications

Monographs 

Author
 Meaning and Structure (Aldershot: Ashgate, 2001)
 Doing Worlds with Words (Dordrecht: Kluwer, 1995)

Editor
 Meaning: the Dynamic Turn (Oxford: Elsevier, 2003)
 Truth and its Nature (Dordrecht: Kluwer, 1999)

See also 

 Prague Linguistic Circle

External links 
 Jaroslav Peregrin — biography @ Philosophy Compass, published by Blackwell
 Works by Jaroslave Peregrin — Peregrin's bibliography @ PhilPapers.org
 Jarda Peregrin — Peregrin's own personal web-site

Academic staff of Charles University
Czech philosophers
Philosophy academics
Semanticists
Living people
1957 births
Philosophers of linguistics